The 2011 OFC U-20 Championship, is the 18th OFC Under 20 Qualifying Tournament, the biennial football championship of Oceania (OFC) in which the winner qualifies for the FIFA U-20 World Cup. It will be held in New Zealand in April 2011.

Each Participating Association may nominate up to 20 players, two of whom must be goalkeepers for the 
Championship.

No player may be replaced in the Official Team List during the Championship, except if it involves a goalkeeper who is injured during the Championship and can no longer take part in the remainder of the matches, and only after acceptance and confirmation by a designated Medical Officer that the injury is sufficiently serious to prevent the goalkeeper from taking part in the Championship.

Group A

Coach:  Rupeni Luvu

Coach:  Claudio Canosa

Coach:  Max Foster

Coach:  Moise Poida

Group B

Coach:  Stephane Drahusak

Coach:  Chris Milicich

Coach:  Noel Wgapu

References

2011